Barkers Branch is a  long 1st order tributary to Lanes Creek in Union County, North Carolina.

Course
Barkers Branch rises about 0.25 miles northeast of Allens Crossroads, North Carolina.  Barkers Branch then flows northeast and then turns east to meet Lanes Creek about 2 miles north of Sturdivants Crossroads, North Carolina.

Watershed
Barkers Branch drains  of area, receives about 48.2 in/year of precipitation, has a topographic wetness index of 434.32 and is about 38% forested.

References

Rivers of North Carolina
Rivers of Union County, North Carolina
Tributaries of the Pee Dee River